Jamboti  (Konkani: Zambotim)  is located  south-west of Belgaum and  west of Khanapur in the Belgaum District of Karnataka, India.

Mandovi River, the longest river in Goa, has its origin in the Jamboti hills. Most of the area is agricultural land, and agriculture is the main source of employment. Parwad and Kankumbhi are the hill stations, with hilltop forests surrounding the area.

Transport
Belgaum airport, 39 km to the north-east of Jamboti. Khanapur Railway Station is the nearest railhead. State Highway 31 passes through Jamboti.

Notes

External links
Jamboti Coordinates & map

Cities and towns in Belagavi district
Tourism in Karnataka